80,000 Hours is a London-based nonprofit organisation that conducts research on which careers have the largest positive social impact and provides career advice based on that research. It provides this advice on their website and podcast, and through one-on-one advice sessions. The organisation is part of the Centre for Effective Altruism, affiliated with the Oxford Uehiro Centre for Practical Ethics. The organisation's name refers to the typical amount of time someone spends working over a lifetime.

Principles 
According to 80,000 Hours, some careers aimed at doing good are far more effective than others. They evaluate problems people can focus on solving in terms of their "scale", "neglectedness", and "solvability", while career paths are rated on their potential for immediate social impact, on how well they set someone up to have an impact later on, and on personal fit with the reader.

The group emphasises that the positive impact of choosing a certain occupation should be measured by the amount of additional good that is created as a result of that choice, not by the amount of good done directly.

It considers indirect ways of making a difference, such as earning to give (earning a high salary in a conventional career and donating a large portion of it), as well as more direct ways, such as scientific research or shaping government policy.

The moral philosopher Peter Singer mentions the example of banking and finance as a potentially high impact career through such donations in his TED Talk, "The why and how of effective altruism," where he discusses the work of 80,000 Hours.

Focus areas 
80,000 Hours' primary focus is on advising talented graduates between the ages of 20 and 40.

It advocates longtermism, the view that improving the long-term future is a moral priority, due to the large number of people who will or could exist in the future. Accordingly, the organisation spends significant resources considering interventions perceived to have persisting effects over time, such as preventing nuclear warfare or a particularly severe pandemic, improving relations between China and the United States, or enhancing decision-making in large organisations.

Reception 
80,000 Hours has recommended earning to give, the practice of pursuing a high-earning career and donating a significant portion of the income to cost-effective charities. This recommendation has been received with some skepticism. Pete Mills argued in the Oxford Left Review that because the likelihood of bringing about social change is difficult to quantify, 80,000 Hours is biased toward quantifiable methods of doing good, such as earning to give.
Over time, 80,000 Hours has deemphasised "earning to give", in favour of alternative paths like research, advocacy or policy reform, and begun recommending work on problems that are less easily quantified.

Funding 
The largest funder of 80,000 Hours has been Open Philanthropy backed by husband and wife Dustin Moskovitz and Cari Tuna with $10m of cumulative donations up to 2019. Other significant individual donors include Ben Delo, Luke Ding, Sam Bankman-Fried, Alex Gordon-Brown, Denise Melchin and Jaan Tallinn. Organisational funders have included the Frederick Mulder Foundation and the Effective Altruism Meta Fund. It received $50,000 from Y Combinator in 2015.

See also
Applied ethics
Effective altruism
GiveWell

References

Further reading

External links

Centre for Effective Altruism
2011 establishments in the United Kingdom
Altruism
Career advice services
Organisations based in London
Organizations established in 2011
Y Combinator nonprofit organizations